Funarës is a village in the Elbasan County, mid Albania. At the 2015 local government reform it became part of the municipality Librazhd.

Demographic History
Funarës (Fanaris) is attested in the Ottoman defter of 1467 as a village in the vilayet of Çermeniça. It had a total of four households represented by the following household heads: Gjin Shigoni, Tose Pali, Kal Dobri, and Llazar Mamiza.

References

Populated places in Librazhd
Villages in Elbasan County